Bestuzhevo is the name of several rural localities in Russia:
Bestuzhevo, Altai Krai, a selo in Ilyinsky Selsoviet of Shipunovsky District of Altai Krai
Bestuzhevo, Arkhangelsk Oblast, a selo in Bestuzhevsky Selsoviet of Ustyansky District of Arkhangelsk Oblast
Bestuzhevo, Moscow Oblast, a village in Bolsherogachevskoye Rural Settlement of Dmitrovsky District of Moscow Oblast
Bestuzhevo, Nizhny Novgorod Oblast, a selo in Shatovsky Selsoviet of Arzamassky District of Nizhny Novgorod Oblast
Bestuzhevo, Ryazan Oblast, a selo in Yurakovsky Rural Okrug of Korablinsky District of Ryazan Oblast
Bestuzhevo, Tula Oblast, a village in Butyrskaya Rural Administration of Uzlovsky District of Tula Oblast
Bestuzhevo, Ulyanovsk Oblast, a settlement in Krasnoselsky Rural Okrug of Novospassky District of Ulyanovsk Oblast
Bestuzhevo, Vologda Oblast, a village in Gulinsky Selsoviet of Belozersky District of Vologda Oblast